Prairie dock is a common name for several plants:

Silphium perfoliatum
Silphium terebinthinaceum
Parthenium integrifolium